Marina Zarma (born 11 May 1978) is a Cypriot swimmer. She competed in the women's 200 metre freestyle and women's 400 metre freestyle events at the 1996 Summer Olympics.

References

1978 births
Living people
Cypriot female swimmers
Olympic swimmers of Cyprus
Swimmers at the 1996 Summer Olympics
Place of birth missing (living people)
Cypriot female freestyle swimmers